SM U-22 or U-XXII was a  or U-boat built for and operated by the Austro-Hungarian Navy ( or ) during the First World War. The design for U-22 was based on submarines of the Royal Danish Navy's Havmanden class (three of which had been built in Austria-Hungary), and was largely obsolete by the beginning of the war.

The submarine was laid down in mid 1915 and launched in January 1917. The still unfinished U-boat sank in the harbor at Fiume in June but was raised, repaired, and relaunched in October. After her commissioning in November, U-22 patrolled off the Po River estuary and, later, in the northern Adriatic out of Trieste.

After undergoing months of repairs for her failed electric motor in mid 1918, U-22 returned to duty and patrolled off the Montenegrin coast out of Cattaro in August. At Cattaro at the end of World War I, U-22 was ceded to France as a war reparation and scrapped in 1920. U-22 had no wartime successes.

Design and construction 
When it became apparent to the Austro-Hungarian Navy that the First World War would not be a short one, they moved to bolster their U-boat fleet by seizing the plans for the Danish Havmanden class submarines, three of which had been built at Whitehead & Co. in Fiume. Although the Austro-Hungarian Navy was not happy with the design, which was largely obsolete, it was the only design for which plans were available and which could be begun immediately in domestic shipyards. The Austro-Hungarian Navy unenthusiastically placed orders for U-22 and her three sister boats on 27 March 1915.

U-22 was one of two boats of the class to be built at the Hungarian UBAG yard in Fiume. Due to demands by the Hungarian government, subcontracts for the class were divided between Hungarian and Austrian firms, and this politically expedient solution worsened technical problems with the design, resulting in numerous modifications and delays for the class in general.

U-22 was an ocean-going submarine that displaced  surfaced and  submerged and was designed for a complement of 18. For propulsion, she featured a single shaft, a single  diesel engine for surface running, and a single  electric motor for submerged travel. She was capable of  while surfaced and  while submerged.

U-22 was armed with two  torpedo tubes located in the front and carried a complement of two torpedoes. She was also equipped with a  deck gun and an  machine gun.

U-22 was laid down at Fiume in mid 1915 and launched on 27 January 1917, the last of the four U-20-class boats to be launched. On 10 June, while not yet complete, the U-boat sank in the harbor at Fiume. Raised from her resting point at a depth of  the following day, U-22 underwent four months of repairs. She was launched again on 6 October.

Service career 
On 18 November 1917 the U-boat sailed for Pola, where she was commissioned as SM U-22 on 23 November under the command of Linienschiffsleutnant Josef Holub. The 31-year-old Galician had been assigned to U-22 in February and had been in charge of sister boat  from June 1916 until his assignment to U-22.

Holub led U-22 out on her first patrol when they departed Pola on 5 December for duty off the Po estuary. After returning to Pola on 10 December, Holub led U-22 on another Po estuary tour from 15 to 17 December. His replacement was Linienschiffsleutnant Friedrich Sterz. It was the first U-boat command of the 25-year-old native of Pergine, Tyrolia (in present-day Italy).

On 3 January 1918, Sterz returned U-22 to the Po estuary for a third patrol there. While in the area, an enemy submarine was spotted but no attack could be made because of bad weather; the same bad weather forced U-22 to put in at Rovigno the following day. Setting out from Rovigno on 5 January, U-22 unsuccessfully attacked an Italian torpedo boat and two steamships. After a return to Rovigno on 6 January, Sterz steered his boat to the submarine base at Brioni. Ten days later, U-22 headed to Trieste, where she conducted patrols in the northern Adriatic. On 5 February, U-22 avoided being hit by seven bombs dropped by an enemy airplane. Departing the northern Adriatic in late April, U-22 was headed for Cattaro when her electric motor failed. After a quick stop at Cattaro, U-22 returned to Pola for three months of repairs.

After returning to service in August, U-22 operated out of Catttaro, patrolling off the Montenegrin coast over the next two months. On 17 October, the boat returned to Cattaro, where she remained until the war's end. She was ceded to France as a war reparation and scrapped in 1920. Like all of her sister boats, U-22 had no wartime successes.

Notes

References

Bibliography 

 
 
 

U-20-class submarines
U-boats commissioned in 1917
1917 ships
World War I submarines of Austria-Hungary
Ships built in Fiume